John McVicar (21 March 1940 – 6 September 2022) was a British journalist and convicted one-time armed robber who escaped from prison.

Career

As a criminal
McVicar's criminal career began in his teens with shop break-ins and car thefts. In 1956, at the age of 16, while awaiting trial, he escaped from a remand home for young offenders, before being sentenced to two years Borstal training. On his release he graduated to armed robber. In 1964 he was arrested and sentenced to eight years in prison. Despite being incarcerated in HM Prison Parkhurst, which was then a top security jail on the Isle of Wight, McVicar managed to escape again.

Whilst he was on the run, McVicar attempted to rob an armoured security van, was recaptured, charged with more offences and sentenced to another 15 years in prison consecutive to the eight he was already serving.

The UK Prison Service moved him to another maximum security jail, HM Prison Durham, from which he escaped again and remained on the run for two years, living incognito in Blackheath, South London, with his girlfriend and their young son.

The escape from Durham led to him being declared "Public Enemy No. 1" by Scotland Yard, until he was apprehended and made to continue his 23-year prison sentence. He was paroled in 1978.

As a journalist

Telling his story
After his release, McVicar wrote his autobiography, McVicar by Himself, and scripted the biographical film McVicar (1980), which starred The Who's lead singer Roger Daltrey in the title role and co-starred Adam Faith. Also after his release from prison, he studied for a postgraduate degree at the University of Leicester.

Journalism 
In the 1980s McVicar  embarked upon a career in journalism, with work published in  Sunday Times, the Guardian, Punch, the New Statesman, Time Out. He was frequently called upon to comment on crime and punishment matters, such as the 1990 HM Prison Strangeways riots, in Manchester.

Christie v. McVicar
In 1998, McVicar lost a libel action brought by sprinter Linford Christie over his claim that Christie was a "steroid athlete."

The Jill Dando murder
In 2002, McVicar published a book about the murder of broadcaster Jill Dando, Dead On Time. In it, he paints Barry George as a sophisticated liar, trying to appear too stupid to carry out a difficult mission. The book appeared after George's first appeal was rejected. (The conviction was overturned in 2008, and George was released.) McVicar subsequently wrote Who Killed Jill? You Decide, in which he examines the British jury system. This second book is purged of the chapters recounting 'personal experiences' which McVicar claims were the product of poetic license for the most part.

Personal life and death
McVicar was born in London on 21 March, 1940.  The son of shopkeepers, George and Diane McVicar, in 1965 he fathered a son, Russell, conceived with his girlfriend, Shirley Wilshire, while he was on the run from HMP Parkhurst. Shirley and McVicar married in 1972, but she divorced him before his final release from prison in 1978. Russell McVicar became estranged from his father but followed in his criminal footsteps, taking up armed robbery and prison escapes. In May 1998 he was sentenced to 15 years for armed robbery, but escaped in 2004 and remained at large for eight years before being recaptured in 2012.

In 2002, John McVicar married Countess Valentina Artsrunik at the Russian Orthodox Church in Knightsbridge, London. Although the couple ran a publishing business and together travelled widely, their marriage was strained and they lived apart. At the time of his death McVicar was living in a caravan in Althorne, Maldon, Essex.

John McVicar died from a suspected heart attack on 6 September 2022, at the age of 82, whilst walking his dog.

See also
 Durham (HM Prison)

References

1940 births
2022 deaths
20th-century British criminals
Alumni of the University of Leicester
British male criminals
British male journalists
British people convicted of robbery
English autobiographers